Payin' the Dues is the second album released by the Swedish rock band The Hellacopters and their last studio album to feature original guitarist Dregen before his departure from the band to focus full-time on his other band Backyard Babies. The album was released simultaneously on both CD and on vinyl; however, "City Slang" was only available on the vinyl edition. The initial pressings were in 2000 units of clear smoke and 2,500 units in purple vinyl. Two additional pressings were later available in two different versions of black vinyl. The Toy's Factory release also featured the bonus track "Oh Yeah Alright".

Release
Prior to the release of Payin' the Dues, The Hellacopters had a release party for the album on 21 September 1997. The album was released on 1 October 1997 on White Jazz Records where it was released on vinyl and compact disc. The first vinyl released was limited to 2000 copies on clear smokey vinyl while the second was limited to 2500 on purple vinyl. 
Following the release, the group had a tour a Scandinavian tour with shows in Sweden, Denmark and Norway with opening group Turpentines.

Sub Pop re-released the album on 19 October 1999. Sub Pop's vinyl record release of the album contained the bonus track "City Slang".

Reception

Track listing

The track "City Slang," a cover of the song by Sonic's Rendezvous Band, appears on the vinyl edition of the album as track #6, after "Hey!"

Limited Edition 

On 19 October 1999 the album was reissued in the USA on CD and vinyl along with an additional live album containing the following bonus tracks:

Special guest: Scott Morgan (guest electric rhythm and lead guitar, vocals on Downright Blue and City Slang (only on vinyl, after Downright Blue)

Credits 

Recorded at The Starfish Room, Vancouver, BC, Canada on 28 May 1999
recording by Steve Smith and the Kirene Studios Mobile Studio unit
Recording assistant: Jon Schluckabier, Brian Valentino and Tameen Bakkar
Mixed by Steve Smith at Kirene Studios, Bellevue, WA
Mastered by John Golden at John Golden Mastering, Ventura, CA
Produced by Steve Smith and Dana Sims

Footnotes

External links 
Official Website

1997 albums
The Hellacopters albums